The Edmundston–Madawaska Bridge is an international bridge which connects the cities of Edmundston, New Brunswick, in Canada and Madawaska, Maine, in the United States, across the Saint John River.

The bridge was constructed in 1920, replacing a cable ferry, and opened in 1921. Its original asphalt and timber deck was replaced with the current steel grid deck in 1961.

Transport Canada estimated the bridge's traffic at 759,803 vehicles annually in 2006.

Effective October 27, 2017, the Edmundston-Madawaska Bridge weight restriction was reduced to 5 tons.

Construction on a new bridge, intended to serve as a replacement, began in May 2021. The new bridge is expected to be opened by the end of 2023, after which the current bridge is slated for demolition.

Border crossing

The Madawaska - Edmundston Border Crossing is located at the Edmundston–Madawaska Bridge that connects the town of Madawaska, Maine with Edmundston, New Brunswick on the Canada–US border.  

The first US border station at Madawaska was a small white cabin at the end of the bridge.  Around 1930, a two-story wooden border station was constructed.  This was replaced by the current one-story brick border station in 1960.  For many years, Canada had a small wooden border station with a red roof.  This structure was replaced in 1992 with the current brick facility.

As part of the new bridge construction project, a new land port of entry will be built on the Madawaska side; construction is projected to begin in summer 2021.

See also 
 List of bridges in Canada

References

External links

 Transport Canada

Road bridges in New Brunswick
Canada–United States bridges
International bridges in Maine
Truss bridges in Canada
Truss bridges in the United States
Bridges completed in 1920
Transport in Edmundston
Buildings and structures in Edmundston
Transportation buildings and structures in Aroostook County, Maine
Bridges over the Saint John River (Bay of Fundy)
Madawaska, Maine
Road bridges in Maine
Steel bridges in the United States
Steel bridges in Canada
1921 establishments in Maine
1921 establishments in New Brunswick